Teen Titans Go! & DC Super Hero Girls: Mayhem in the Multiverse is a 2022 direct-to-video animated superhero comedy film and a crossover between the television series Teen Titans Go! and DC Super Hero Girls, which is adapted from the DC Comics superhero team of the same name, and the DC Super Hero Girls franchise. It is the first DC Super Hero Girls film in four years since 2018's DC Super Hero Girls: Legends of Atlantis, and the first one to center on the 2019 incarnation. It was released on DVD and Blu-ray on May 24, 2022, followed by a premiere on Cartoon Network on May 28. The film also served as the fourth Teen Titans Go! film, following Teen Titans Go! To the Movies, Teen Titans Go! vs. Teen Titans, and Teen Titans Go! See Space Jam, and also served as the series finale of the DC Super Hero Girls TV series.

Synopsis
Lex Luthor manages to trap all of Earth's super-heroes in the Phantom Zone, and it's up to teen Wonder Woman, Supergirl, Batgirl, Bumblebee, Green Lantern, and Zatanna to rescue them. In their travel across dimensions, however, they take a wrong turn and end up in the Teen Titans Tower, where they may not have found the help they deserve, but it's the help they need.

Cast
 Kimberly Brooks as Bumblebee
 Greg Cipes as Beast Boy
 Keith Ferguson as Batman
 Will Friedle as Lex Luthor / Aquaman
 Grey Griffin as Wonder Woman / Young Diana / Giganta
 Phil LaMarr as The Flash / Hawkman / John Stewart
 Scott Menville as Robin
 Max Mittelman as Superman
 Jessica McKenna as Aqualad
 Khary Payton as Cyborg / Narrator
 Alexander Polinsky as Control Freak
 Missi Pyle as Cythonna / Speaker of Nations
 Jason Spisak as Green Lantern / Hal Jordan
 Tara Strong as Batgirl / Raven / Harley Quinn
 Nicole Sullivan as Supergirl
 Cree Summer as Catwoman / Hippolyta
 Fred Tatasciore as Jor-El / Solomon Grundy
 Myrna Velasco as Green Lantern / Jessica Cruz
 Kari Wahlgren as Zatanna / Star Sapphire
 Hynden Walch as Starfire

Development
The film was announced in October 2021 at DC FanDome.

Release 
The film was released on DVD and Blu-ray on May 24, 2022, followed by a premiere on Cartoon Network on May 28.

Reception 
Dillon Gonzales, writing for Geek Vibes Nation, gave the film a review, saying "Teen Titans Go! & DC Super Hero Girls: Mayhem In The Multiverse is a sneaky crossover that promises more of the former than we actually get, but the meta-humor and decently endearing characters should keep you mostly entertained throughout. The film is a bit messy and chaotic, but this is in line with the tone of these light and amusing series."

Accolades 
Tara Strong was nominated for Outstanding Achievement for Voice Acting in an Animated Television / Broadcast Production at the 50th Annie Awards.

References

External links
DC page

2020s direct-to-video animated superhero films
2022 films
2022 animated films
2022 direct-to-video films
Animated crossover films
2020s English-language films
Warner Bros. Animation animated films
American sequel films
Teen Titans Go! (film series)
Films based on Mattel toys
Films about parallel universes
DC Super Hero Girls films
2020s superhero comedy films